The seventh season of British science fiction television series Doctor Who began on 3 January 1970 with Jon Pertwee's first story Spearhead from Space and ended with Inferno. The first season to be made in colour, it marked the beginning of Barry Letts's five seasons as series producer, but it has been described as "essentially devised" by his predecessor, Derrick Sherwin, who produced the opening story. The season sees the beginning of the Doctor's exile to Earth by the Time Lords and his attachment to UNIT as its scientific advisor.

Casting

Main cast 
 Jon Pertwee as the Third Doctor
 Caroline John as Liz Shaw

Jon Pertwee makes his first appearance as the Third Doctor, replacing Patrick Troughton in the role.  Caroline John makes her first appearance as companion and assistant Liz Shaw in Spearhead from Space and last in Inferno.

Recurring cast
 Nicholas Courtney as Brigadier Lethbridge-Stewart
 John Levene as Sergeant Benton

Nicholas Courtney returns as Brigadier Lethbridge-Stewart and he would continue to make regular appearances in Doctor Who until season 13. 

John Levene also makes his first appearance as Sergeant Benton since The Invasion in The Ambassadors of Death and would continue to make regular appearances until season 13.

Serials 

From this season onwards the programme was produced in colour. Barry Letts also took over as producer, beginning with the second serial, Doctor Who and the Silurians, when Derrick Sherwin left to co-produce another BBC series, Paul Temple. The number of episodes in a season was cut to accommodate the new production methods: season 6 has 44 episodes; season 7 has 25 episodes. The seasons would continue to have between 20 and 26 episodes until season 22. Following the opening four parter, the remaining episodes were divided into three serials each of seven episodes. 

Setting the entire season on Earth had been the choice of Sherwin, who had introduced the military organisation UNIT in his earlier serial The Invasion (1968), which he had written and Peter Bryant had produced. Sherwin had also produced the final black-and-white serial, The War Games (1969), in which the Second Doctor had been put on trial by the Time Lords and exiled to Earth in the 20th century. In Spearhead from Space the Doctor becomes, despite his initial reluctance, UNIT's scientific advisor on a regular basis, which would continue into Tom Baker's first two seasons as the Fourth Doctor. According to Sherwin on his DVD commentary for Spearhead from Space, the BBC had considered replacing Doctor Who with a new Quatermass serial, but this fell through because Nigel Kneale was not interested in that, nor writing for Doctor Who when Sherwin had approached him about it. The plan did, however, have an effect on the Earth-based style of the programme, with Quatermass cited as an influence on season 7.

Spearhead from Space was intended to be produced identically to previous serials and others in the season, with a mixture of location material shot on 16mm film and studio material on videotape. Owing to industrial action by studio technicians at the BBC, the planned studio recording sessions were cancelled, with instead all four episodes being shot on location on 16mm film.

Home media

VHS releases

DVD and Blu-ray releases

In print

References

Bibliography 

 
 

1970 British television seasons
Season 07
Season 07
7